State Route 400 (SR 400) is a state highway in Washington and Carter counties in the U.S. state of Tennessee. It connects the cities of Johnson City, Watauga and Elizabethton.

Route description
SR 400 begins as a pair of one way streets (Watauga and Unaka Avenues) at an intersection with SR 91 (which is also a pair of one way streets) in downtown Johnson City. It heads north to have an interchange with I-26/US 23/US 19W (Exit 22) and continues northeast as a pair of one way streets. The northbound lanes then leave Watauga Avenue and turn northwest onto North Broadway Street and joins to the southbound lanes as Unaka Avenue and continues northeast to the city of Watauga where SR 400 crosses over the Watauga River at the Johnson City/Watauga city boundary. SR 400 passes through downtown Watauga and turns more southeasterly and leaves the city of Watauga and continues southeast until it comes to an intersection with Old U.S. Route 19E. It then turns south and crosses over the Watauga River again and enters the city of Elizabethton and continues south until its northern terminus at an intersection with US 321/SR 67 in Elizabethton.

Junction list

References

400
Transportation in Washington County, Tennessee
Transportation in Carter County, Tennessee
Johnson City, Tennessee
Elizabethton, Tennessee